The following is a List of defunct universities and colleges in Missouri. This list includes accredited, degree-granting institutions and bona fide institutions of higher learning that operated before accreditation existed. All had at least one location within the state of Missouri, and all have since discontinued operations or their operations were taken over by another similar institution of higher learning.

Defunct colleges and universities in Missouri 

 Arcadia College
 Brown Mackie College
 Central Bible College
 Central Female College
 Clarksburg College
 George R. Smith College
 Hardin College and Conservatory of Music
 Hickey College (closed)
 Howard–Payne Junior College
 Kaplan University
 Kemper Military School
 Lewis College
 Lincoln University School of Law
 Marillac College
 Marion College (Missouri)
 Masonic College
 Missouri Wesleyan College
 Will Mayfield College
 Missouri College
 Pritchett College
 Ruskin Colleges
 St. Charles College (Missouri)
 St. Joseph Female College
 Scarritt College
 Seminex
 Synodical College
 University of Phoenix
 Vatterott College
 Weaubleau Christian College
 Wentworth Military Academy and College
 Woman's Medical College of St. Louis